The Fra Cristobal Range, (Fra Cristóbal Range) is a 17 mi (27 km) long, mountain range in central-north Sierra County, New Mexico.  Its northern extreme above Fra Cristoblal Mountain extends into Socorro County.  The range borders the eastern shore of Elephant Butte Reservoir on the Rio Grande, and the range lies towards the southwest of the Jornada del Muerto, the desert region east of the river.

Description
The Fra Cristobal Range is an arid, moderate elevation, north–south trending mountain range, about 17 mi long and narrow, only about 7 mi at its widest. Crater Hill,  lies west of the central ridgeline, and north of Black Bluffs, Red Cliff at the Reservoir.

The high peak in the northern end of the range, which gives the range its name, is Fra Cristobal Mountain, is at the north perimeter of the range. It is located at   The mountain is said to have resembled the profile of a priest, Fray Cristóbal de Salazar, a cousin of Juan de Oñate, with the first colonizing expedition in 1598.

References

External links
Range Highpoint
Fra Cristobal Mountain, mountainzone, (coordinates), (elev: 5955)
Fra Cristobal Range
Crater Hill, (approximate range center (at west)), mountainzone, coordinates
Fra Cristobal Range, mountainzone

Mountain ranges of Sierra County, New Mexico
Mountain ranges of New Mexico
Tularosa Basin